Ukrainian political crisis may refer to:
 2000–2001 Ukrainian political crisis (Cassette Scandal)
 2004–2005 Ukrainian political crisis (Orange Revolution)
 2006 Ukrainian political crisis
 2007 Ukrainian political crisis
 2008 Ukrainian political crisis
 2013–2014 Ukrainian political crisis (Revolution of Dignity)
 2020–2022 Ukrainian constitutional crisis